Tahe is a county in the far north of Heilongjiang province, and is the northernmost Chinese county. It is under the jurisdiction of Daxing'anling Prefecture.

Administrative divisions 
Tahe County is divided into 4 towns, 2 townships and 1 ethnic township. 
4 towns

2 townships
 Yisiken
 Kaikukang
1 ethnic township
 Shibazhan Oroqen

Demographics 

Climate
Tahe County has a subarctic climate (Köppen Dwc) with short, warm, wet summers and long, brutally cold and dry winters. Monsoonal influences are strong, as 75% of the annual precipitation occurs from June to September. Although snowfall is extremely light, totalling only a few centimetres during the winter, it does not melt until May. The region is in the discontinuous permafrost zone, which severely limits land use possibilities since only exposed areas thaw fully during the summer, and fishing is the most important economic activity.

External links
  Government Site -

Notes and references 

Tahe